Alexandre-Gabriel Decamps (March 3, 1803August 22, 1860) was a French painter noted for his Orientalist works.

Life
Decamps was born in Paris. In his youth he travelled in the East, and reproduced Oriental life and scenery with a bold fidelity to nature that puzzled conventional critics. His powers, however, soon came to be recognized, and he was ranked along with Delacroix and Ingres as one of the leaders of the French school. At the Paris Exhibition of 1855 he received the grand or council medal. Most of his life was passed in the neighborhood of Paris. He was fond of animals, especially dogs, and indulged in all kinds of field sports.

He died in 1860 in consequence of being thrown from a horse while hunting at Fontainebleau.

Founding father of Orientalism
Decamps was the founding father of Orientalism since he revealed everyday Oriental life in the 1831 Salon in Paris. His subjects and style with strong contrast of light and thick material became the reference for painters but also photographers and writers.
He was the most influential painter on Orientalism and was proclaimed the chief of the new Orientalist School. Delacroix referred to him in the Women of Algiers (1834),  and the Fanatics of Tangiers (1838). Théophile Gautier's Constantinople (1853) was described as an “immense verbal Decamps” by Henry James. Maxime Du Camp named him the Christopher Columbus of the Orient and Théophile Gautier compared his role as the discoverer of the Orient to the role of Jean-Jacques Rousseau as the discoverer of nature in the eighteenth century. Christine Peltre concludes that the only equivalent to his fame were the Arabian Nights (One Thousand and One Nights).

Works
Decamps' style was characteristically and intensely French. It was marked by vivid dramatic conception, bold and even rough brushstrokes, and startling contrasts of color and of light and shade. His subjects embraced an unusually wide range. He availed himself of his travels in the East in dealing with scenes from Scripture history, which he was probably the first of European painters to represent with their true and natural local background. Of this class were his Joseph sold by his Brethren, Moses taken from the Nile, and his scenes from the life of Samson, nine vigorous sketches in charcoal and white.

Perhaps the most impressive of his historical pictures is Defeat of the Cimbri, representing the conflict between a horde of barbarians and a disciplined army. Decamps produced a number of genre pictures, chiefly scenes from French and Turkish domestic life, the most marked feature of which is humour. The same characteristic attaches to many of his numerous animal paintings; Decamps was especially fond of painting monkeys. His well-known painting The Monkey Connoisseurs satirizes the jury of the French Academy of Painting, which had rejected several of his earlier works on account of their divergence from any known standard.

His paintings and drawings were first made familiar to the English public through the lithographs of Eugene le Rouit.

Gallery

See also
List of Orientalist artists
Orientalism

References

External links

Alexandre-Gabriel Decamps at PubHist

19th-century French painters
French male painters
1803 births
1860 deaths
Academic art
Painters from Paris
Deaths by horse-riding accident in France
Officiers of the Légion d'honneur
Orientalist painters
Animal painters
19th-century French male artists